"Mini Bus" is a song by Jamaican dub, reggae, and dancehall artist Barrington Levy. It was released first as a single in 1984 as a 45 on 12-inch vinyl. Subsequently, it was released on CD in 1990 as the ninth track on the compilation album Broader than Broadway.

Track listing
UK Vinyl Single

"Mini Bus" - 6:30
"Red Eye" - 6:00

Broader Than Broadway

"Shake It" [The Lindbergh Palace Remix] - 6:25
"Here I Come (Broader Than Broadway)" - 3:39 	
"Under Me Sensi" - 4:32 	
"Teach The Youth" - 3:36 	
"Prison Oval Rock" - 4:07 	
"Shine Eye Girl - 2:49 	
"Bounty Hunter - 3:48 	
"The Vibes Is Right - 4:14 	
"Too Experienced - 3:20 	
"Minibus (On The Telephone) - 3:21 	
"Money Move - 3:20 	
"She's Mine - 3:53 	
"You Have Caught Me - 3:39 	
"Here I Come" [1990 Remix] - 5:38

Influences
The song features certain syntactical and structural influences from the song Hush, Little Baby.

Release history

References
Discography from discogs.com
Reggae charts 1984

1984 songs